Abdullah Pasha may refer to:

 Köprülü Abdullah Pasha (1684–1735), Ottoman general and military commander
 Seyyid Abdullah Pasha (died 1761), Ottoman grand vizier (1747–50) and governor of Egypt (1751–52)
 Naili Abdullah Pasha (died 1758), Ottoman grand vizier (1755)
 Abdullah Pasha al-Azm (fl. 1783–1810), Ottoman governor of Damascus, Aleppo, Adana, and Rakka
 Abdullah Pasha ibn Ali (born 1801), Ottoman governor of Acre and Sidon (1820–1832)
 Kölemen Abdullah Pasha (1846–1937), Ottoman general in the First Balkan War
 Abdullah Pashë Dreni (1820–1878), military and tribal leader in the Kosovo Vilayet

See also
 Abdullah (name)
 Pasha (title)